The Aurora Islands was a group of three phantom islands first reported in 1762 by the Spanish merchant ship Aurora while sailing from Lima to Cadiz. The Aurora's officers reported sighting them again in 1774. The Spanish ship San Miguel fixed their location at 52°37'S, 47°49'W. On 20 February 1794, they were sighted again by a Spanish survey ship, the corvette Atrevida, which as part of the Alejandro Malaspina circumnavigation had been sent to confirm them. The latitude is considered perfect; the longitude was based on the meridian of the astronomical observatory, San Fernando, Cádiz. The islands were last reportedly sighted in 1856, but continued to appear on maps of the South Atlantic until the 1870s.

It is possible that the Aurora islands were "discovered" by Amerigo Vespucci in his 1501/1502 voyage with a Portuguese expedition. In his "Lettera" of 1504, his most detailed note, he states that he left the coast of Brazil from Cabo Frío and followed the path of the Sirocco south-east covering 500 leagues (about 3000 kilometres) by sea down to 50°S or 52°S. The probability is confirmed by Vice-Admiral Ernesto Basilico in The Third Voyage of Amerigo Vespucci (Buenos Aires, 1967) and by Lt-Cdr Barreiro Meiro (General Journal of Navy, October 1968, Madrid). At latitude 52°S Vespucci discovered an island 20 leagues (118 kilometres) long:

The only large islands in 52°S latitude were the as then undiscovered Falklands, but Vespucci's description does not fit the Falklands, whose low-lying coasts are full of coves for shelter and are not "wild". 3 April is not winter but the first month of autumn and a night of fifteen hours duration implies a mysterious shift of the sun; furthermore, sailors would not find the cold intolerable at that season of the year in 52°S. The suggestion of aberrant conditions accompanying a fierce storm is typical of a number of phantom islands, particularly Saint Brendan's Island.

Raymond Ramsay suggests several possible explanations for the persistent reports of sightings over the century from 1762, including a massive iceberg, the possibility that the Aurora Islands are the Shag Rocks, and the possibility that they sank, but dismisses them all. He concludes that "there is actually no wholly satisfactory explanation for the Aurora Islands and they remain one of the great unsolved mysteries of the sea". Commenting on Ramsay's dismissal of the possibility that they sank, Stephen Royle notes that several volcanic islands have been known to have disappeared in recent times.

They are the subject of a 2001 novel entitled Hippolyte's Island, by Barbara Hodgson, during which they are rediscovered by the book's protagonist. In an episode in Edgar Allan Poe's novel, The Narrative of Arthur Gordon Pym of Nantucket, Pym and his crewmates search for but fail to find them.

See also
Pepys Island

Citations

References
 Gould, Rupert T. (1944), "The Auroras, and other doubtful islands", in Oddities: A Book of Unexplained Facts, revised ed., Geoffrey Bles, pp. 124–162. Reprinted by Kessinger Pub Co., 2003, .
 Ramsay, Raymond (1972). No Longer on the Map. Ballantine Books, pp 78–80.
 Royle, Stephen A. (2001). A geography of islands: small island insularity Routledge .
 Stommel, Henry (1984). Lost Islands: The Story of Islands That Have Vanished from Nautical Charts. Vancouver: University of British Columbia Press, pp 84–97. .

Phantom subantarctic islands
History of South Georgia and the South Sandwich Islands
History of the Falkland Islands
Islands of the South Atlantic Ocean
Archipelagoes of the Atlantic Ocean
1762 in Southeast Asia
Phantom islands of the Atlantic